The president of Guatemala, officially known as the President of the Republic of Guatemala, is the head of state and head of government of Guatemala, elected to a single four-year term. The position of President was created in 1839.

Requirements to hold office
According to article 185 of the constitution, the following is required to be president:

 A Guatemalan of origin who is a citizen in good standing.
 40 years of age.

Under article 186, relatives of the incumbent president or vice president are not allowed to run in the succeeding election.

Duties and competences
According to article 183 of the constitution, the following duties and competences are conferred to the president:

 Comply with and enforce the Constitution and laws.
 Provide the defense and security of the Nation, as well as the preservation of public order.
 Exercise the command of the Armed Forces of Guatemala with all the respective functions and attributions.
 Exercise the command of the National Police.
 Approve, promulgate, execute and enforce laws.
 Dictate the provisions that are necessary in cases of serious emergency or public calamity, having to report to the Congress in its immediate sessions.
 Submit proposals of laws to the Congress.
 Exercise the right of veto with respect to the laws issued by the Congress, except in cases in which it is not necessary to sanction the executive branch in accordance with the Constitution.
 Present annually to the Congress, at the beginning of its session, written report on the general situation of the Republic and of the business of its administration carried out during the previous year.
 Submit annually to the Congress, for approval with no less than one hundred and twenty days prior to the date on which the fiscal year begins, through the Ministry of Public Finance, the draft budget that contains in detail the income and expenditures of the State. If the Congress is not in session, it must hold extraordinary sessions to hear about the project.
 Submit for consideration of the Congress for approval, and before ratification, treaties and conventions of international character and contracts and concessions on public services.
 To summon the Legislative Organism to extraordinary sessions when the interests of the Republic demand it.
 Coordinate the development policy of the Nation through the Council of Ministers.
 Preside over the Council of Ministers and exercise the function of hierarchical superior of the officials and employees of the Executive Organism.
 Maintain the territorial integrity and dignity of the Nation.
 Direct foreign policy and international relations, pronounce, ratify and denounce treaties and agreements in accordance with the Constitution.
 Receive the diplomatic representatives, as well as issue and withdraw the exequatur to the patents of the consuls.
 Administer public finances in accordance with the law.
 Exonerate of fines and surcharges to the taxpayers who have incurred in them for not covering the taxes within the legal terms for acts or omissions in the administrative order.
 Appoint and remove ministers of state, deputy ministers, secretaries and undersecretaries of the presidency, ambassadors and other officials that correspond to it according to the law.
 Grant premiums, pensions and subsidies in accordance with the Law.
 Award decorations to Guatemalans and foreigners.
 Within the fifteen days following its conclusion, inform the Congress about the purpose of any trip that has taken place outside the national territory and about the results thereof.
 Submit every four months to the Congress through the respective ministry an analytical report on the budget execution, for its knowledge and control.
 Exercise all other functions assigned by the Constitution or the law.

Heads of state of Guatemala within the Federal Republic of Central America (1824–1839)

Presidents of independent Guatemala (1839–present)
Note: Regarding the numbering of the terms, several reliable sources state that Jimmy Morales is the 50th president

Latest election

Notes

References

Guatemala
 
Presidents
1839 establishments in Guatemala
Lists of Guatemalan people